The Deception is the seventh studio album by Namibian kwaito star The Dogg. The album is released by The Dogg's Mshasho Productions on 2 July 2011. The album features international artists such as South African kwaito star  Brickz and Zambian singer JK.

Other guest on the album includes Sunny Boy, Qonja, OmPuff, Tate Buti, PDK, Fresh Family, KK and Catty Catt.

Track listing
 All songs written and produced by The Dogg

References

2011 albums
The Dogg albums
Albums produced by the Dogg
Mshasho Productions albums